The Korea Janggi Association was founded in 1956 for the promotion of Janggi, or Korean chess, and is based in Seoul, South Korea.

External links
Korea Janggi Association (official website)

References

Janggi
Sports organizations established in 1956